Leelau (Lelo), or Munga after its location, is one of the Bikwin languages of the Bikwin people, spoken in Taraba State, Nigeria.

References

Languages of Nigeria
Bambukic languages